Deanna or DeAnna is a feminine given name.

People with the given name
 DeAnna Bennett (born 1984), American mixed martial artist
 Deanna Bogart (born 1959), American blues singer, pianist, and saxophone player
 Deanna Brooks (born 1974), American glamour model and actress 
 Deanna Cremin (1978–1995), American murder victim
 Deanna D'Alessandro, Australian chemist
 Deanna Dunagan (born 1940), American Actress
 Deanna Durbin  (1921–2013), Canadian actress and singer
 Deanna Favre (born 1968), wife of American football quarterback Brett Favre
 Deanna Lund (born 1937), American film and television actress
 Deanna Michaux (born 1970) American columnist, author and radio host
 Deanna Nolan (born 1979), American basketball player
 Deanna Oliver (born 1952) is an American actress and write
 DeAnna Pappas, American television personality
 Deanna Raybourn (born 1968), American author of historical fiction and historical mysteries
 Deanna Rix (born 1987), American female wrestler
 Deanna Stellato (born 1983), American figure skater
 Deanna Brown singer James Brown's daughter and owner of a radio station.

Fictional characters
 Deanna Monroe, fictional character from the television series The Walking Dead
 Deanna Troi, fictional character in the Star Trek universe

Music
 "Deanna", a song by Nick Cave and the Bad Seeds

See also
Deana

English feminine given names